Commodity Broking Services abbreviated (CBS) is a specialized private Australian brokerage and investment company founded in 2004 by Jonathan Barratt and Paul Mckay. Originally set up in the outback town of Warren, New South Wales, the purpose was to aid and educate Australian farmers suffering from drought with some financial stability in commodity trading and product protection.

With the support of Australian farmers and investors, the company expanded into Sydney, Australia; of which the company is currently headquartered. It still retains strong links with the Warren office, where the agricultural division is located.

Commodity Broking Services offers trading and data via its online trading platform. The range of financial products includes Foreign Exchange, Commodity Swaps, Australian-International CFD’s and Equity, Futures, Options, Superannuation Funds and Bonds.

CBS is also the only financial company that currently provides both physical commodity and commodity swaps in Australia. A commodity swap is a financial instrument that provides produces and end-users of commodities with the ability to hedge their commodity risk in local weights, measures and seasons without having to commit produce to the contract.

Business 
CBS involves itself in three divisions: investment, agricultural and education.

Investment division focuses on offering financial products to individuals, families and funds via the online trading platform.

Agricultural division is focused on assisting farmers with hedging and commodity swap to protect their production and livelihood.

Education division is mainly focused on educational and advisory services for individuals and institutions.

Quick Facts 
 CBS has an alliance with the Danish investment bank, Saxo Bank.
 The company’s logo – A sheaf of wheat, is symbolic for the rewards received from the bond and hard work associated with the harsh Australian environment. It is also the symbol for the Greek Goddess of Fertility - Demeter

References 

Investment companies of Australia
Financial services companies based in Sydney